Amesiodendron chinense is a species of plant in the family Sapindaceae. It is found in China, Indonesia, Laos, Malaysia, and Vietnam.

References

chinense
Near threatened plants
Taxonomy articles created by Polbot